Panaon can refer to
 Panaon Island, an island of the Philippines in the province of Southern Leyte  
 Panaon, Misamis Occidental, a municipality on the island of Mindanao, Philippines